The Sign of Venus is a 1955 Italian comedy film directed by Dino Risi and starring Sophia Loren. It was entered into the 1955 Cannes Film Festival.

Plot
The story revolves around an attractive woman named Agnese (Loren) who has many suitors. She lives with her cousin Cesira (Franca Valeri), who has the opposite problem with men. Vittorio De Sica plays a poet in need of money and Alberto Sordi plays a man who deals in stolen cars.

Cast

 Franca Valeri as Cesira
 Sophia Loren as Agnese Tirabassi
 Vittorio De Sica as Alessio Spano
 Peppino De Filippo as Mario
 Alberto Sordi as Romolo Proietti
 Raf Vallone as Ignazio Bolognini Vigile del fuoco
 Virgilio Riento as Agnese's father
 Tina Pica as Zia Tina
 Lina Gennari as Signora Pina
 Eloisa Cianni as Daisy
 Leopoldo Trieste as Pittore
 Maurizio Arena as Maurice
 Franco Fantasia as Dottore
 Marcella Rovena as Elvira
 Mario Meniconi as Vigile Urbano
 Furio Meniconi as Proprietario della trattoria
 Anita Durante as Madre di Romolo

References

External links 
 

1955 films
1950s Italian-language films
1955 romantic comedy films
Films directed by Dino Risi
Italian black-and-white films
Films set in Rome
Films shot in Rome
Titanus films
Films scored by Renzo Rossellini
Italian romantic comedy films
1950s Italian films